Lavar M. Edwards (born April 29, 1990) is a former American football defensive end. He played college football for Louisiana State University (LSU). He was drafted by the Tennessee Titans in the fifth round of the 2013 NFL Draft.

Early years
Edwards attended Desire Street Academy high school. He was ranked among the top 40 prospects in the state of Louisiana by Rivals.com. During high school, He was named to the Baton Rouge Advocate's Super Dozen.

College career
He accepted a scholarship to play at Louisiana State University for coach Les Miles's LSU Tigers football team from 2009 to 2012. In his last two years, he played defensive end behind Barkevious Mingo and Sam Montgomery.

He finished his college career with a total of 96 tackles, 10.5 sacks, two interceptions and two forced fumbles.  On January 25, 2013, he was selected to participate in the 2013 Senior Bowl.

Professional career

Tennessee Titans
Edwards was selected by the Tennessee Titans in the fifth round (142nd overall) of the 2013 NFL Draft, with the intention of playing defensive end in defensive coordinator Jerry Gray's 4-3 defense. As a rookie, he was inactive for nine games, played in 7 contests (one start), while registering 10 tackles, one tackle for loss, one quarterback pressure and a pass defensed.

The next year defensive coordinator Ray Horton was hired to change the defense to a 3–4 alignment, so he was traded to the Dallas Cowboys in exchange for a conditional seventh round pick (not exercised) on August 30, 2014.

Dallas Cowboys (first stint)
Edwards was waived on September 20, 2014, with this pattern repeating two additional times during the season, until being re-signed to the practice squad on November 3. He was placed on the injured reserve list on December 10, finishing with 10 tackles. He was cut on September 6, 2015, to make room for running back Christine Michael.

Oakland Raiders
A day after being waived by the Dallas Cowboys, Edwards was claimed by the Oakland Raiders. On September 11, 2015, he was cut to make room for linebacker Aldon Smith.

Chicago Bears
On September 16, 2015, he was signed by the Chicago Bears. He was released on September 25.

Dallas Cowboys (second stint)
On September 29, 2015, Edwards was signed to the Dallas Cowboys' practice squad.

Buffalo Bills
On December 1, 2015, he was signed by the Buffalo Bills from the Cowboys practice squad. On September 2, 2016, he was released by the Bills as part of final roster cuts.

Carolina Panthers
On September 4, 2016, Edwards was claimed off waivers by the Panthers. He was released on October 18, 2016.

Indianapolis Colts
Edwards was claimed off waivers by the Indianapolis Colts on October 19, 2016. He was released by the Colts on December 15, 2016, and was signed to the practice squad. He signed a reserve/future contract with the Colts on January 2, 2017. On September 2, 2017, Edwards was waived by the Colts.

Cleveland Browns
On December 13, 2017, Edwards was signed by the Cleveland Browns.

References

External links
LSU Tigers bio

1990 births
Living people
American football defensive ends
LSU Tigers football players
Tennessee Titans players
Dallas Cowboys players
People from Gretna, Louisiana
Players of American football from Louisiana
Oakland Raiders players
Chicago Bears players
Buffalo Bills players
Carolina Panthers players
Indianapolis Colts players
Cleveland Browns players
Saskatchewan Roughriders players
Canadian football defensive linemen
American players of Canadian football